The men's 100 m freestyle at the 2009 World Championships took place on 29 July (heats and semifinals) and the evening of 30 July (finals) at the Foro Italico in Rome, Italy.

Records
Prior to this competition, the existing world and competition records were as follows:

The following records were established during the competition:

* Championships record split from the 4 × 100 m freestyle relay

Results

Preliminary heats

Semifinals

Final

See also
Swimming at the 2007 World Aquatics Championships – Men's 100 metre freestyle
Swimming at the 2008 Summer Olympics – Men's 100 metre freestyle

References
Worlds 2009 results: Men's 100m Free Heats, from OmegaTiming.com (official timer of the 2009 Worlds); retrieved 2009-07-30.
Worlds 2009 results: Men's 100m Free Semifinals, from OmegaTiming.com (official timer of the 2009 Worlds); retrieved 2009-07-30.
Worlds 2009 results: Men's 100m Free Finals, from OmegaTiming.com (official timer of the 2009 Worlds); retrieved 2009-07-30.

Freestyle Men 100